Local elections were held in Turkey on 27 March 1994.

Background

1989 local elections 
In the 1989 Turkish local elections, ANAP suffered a nationwide rout in what many saw as a referendum on the Turgut Özal administration. Nurettin Sözen, a doctor from the center-left Social Democratic People’s Party (SHP) became Istanbul’s mayor, creating hopes for the left’s nationwide rise. The SHP promised a break from the past with its platform focused on clean government and anti-corruption. But under the new administration, things only appeared to get worse. For one thing, Istanbul's population nearly doubled in the 1990s, creating massive demand for public services.

Istanbul in the 1990s 
Istanbul had a large garbage problem in the 1990s and it reached a new high with the Üsküdar garbage explosion when a trash heap in a slum neighborhood exploded. Methane gas had built up beneath the filth, finally igniting and causing an avalanche that killed 27 of the hapless poor. Also, that winter the air was filled with soot from the millions of coal-burning ovens that families were using to heat their homes. Many began wearing surgical masks before going outside.

The İSKİ Scandal 
Three years into Sözen’s term, the İSKİ Scandal broke out. Ergün Göknel, a Sözen appointee who ran the Istanbul Water and Sewerage Administration (İSKİ) had divorced his wife in 1992 to marry an İSKİ employee three decades his junior, offering his wife a divorce settlement valued in the hundreds of thousands of dollars. But his former wife was not content to console herself quietly with her new fortune. She went to the press to declare the size of the settlement, which was far too large for a public servant to afford, and to voice her suspicions about her husband’s alleged illicit dealings. This triggered a flurry of speculation in the press about corruption in İSKİ and the SHP, and Turkey’s prosecutors sprang into action, preparing a handful of high-profile cases against leftist leaders. While İSKİ burned, Göknel married his new wife at the Istanbul Hilton, the city’s first American-built deluxe hotel. Mayor Sözen, infuriated, removed Göknel from his post and declared that he would support the harshest disciplinary action against any corrupt dealings uncovered in a criminal investigation. It was a buck too short, a day too late: the Turkish left, already weakened due to anti-leftist measures implemented in the aftermath of the 1980 coup, died in Istanbul in 1994.

Rise of Erdoğan 
The İSKİ Scandal was unfolding during the peak of the local-elections season, and with every detail it seemed to prove what Necmettin Erbakan and his Welfare Party had been saying all along: that the people were suffering because they were governed by elites whose moral fiber had been rotted by Western ways. Turkey’s leaders were too busy fleecing the public and having affairs with each other to bother themselves with the problems of the suffering masses.

Erdogan’s 1994 campaign played upon these themes with tremendous virtuosity. He called the RP the “voice of the silent masses.” While other parties lacked the grassroots infrastructure to communicate directly with the residents of Istanbul’s shanty towns, the RP machine could interact with them at a highly granular level, thanks to its vast database. Populism, too, helped the RP’s cause. The party pledged to keep bread prices low through municipally subsidized bread factories, and RP representatives handed out coal and groceries in poor neighborhoods, once again taking advantage of their computerized database. It was said that one RP lieutenant even handed out gold coins to prospective voters.

Results
The 1994 nationwide local elections showed that the vast majority of the voting public was still not comfortable with the Islamist RP alternative, even when the establishment parties were at their worst.

Provincial assemblies

Metropolitan municipality mayors

Mayor of other municipalities

References

External links
Results of the local elections (in Turkish) 

Local elections in Turkey
Local